Just Tammy is the twentieth studio album by American country music singer-songwriter Tammy Wynette. It was released on June 11, 1979, by Epic Records.

Commercial performance 
The album peaked at No. 25 on the Billboard Country Albums chart. The album's first single, "They Call It Making Love", peaked at No. 6 on the Billboard Country Singles chart, and the album's second single, "No One Else in the World", peaked at No. 7.

Track listing

Personnel
Adapted from the album liner notes.
Lou Bradley - engineer
Bill McElhiney - string arrangement
The Nashville Edition - backing vocals
Norman Seeff - photography
Billy Sherrill - producer
Sherri West - hair and make-up
Baron Wolman - photography
Tammy Wynette - lead vocals

Chart positions

Album

Singles

References

1979 albums
Tammy Wynette albums
Epic Records albums
Albums produced by Billy Sherrill